Cytochrome c oxidase subunit 7A-related protein, mitochondrial is an enzyme that in humans is encoded by the COX7A2L gene.

Cytochrome c oxidase (COX), the terminal component of the mitochondrial respiratory chain, catalyzes the electron transfer from reduced cytochrome c to oxygen. This component is a heteromeric complex consisting of 3 catalytic subunits encoded by mitochondrial genes and multiple structural subunits encoded by nuclear genes. 

The mitochondrially-encoded subunits function in electron transfer, and the nuclear-encoded subunits may function in the regulation and assembly of the complex. 

This nuclear gene encodes a protein similar to polypeptides 1 and 2 of subunit VIIa in the C-terminal region, and also highly similar to the mouse Sig81 protein sequence. 

This gene is expressed in all tissues, and upregulated in a breast cancer cell line after estrogen treatment. It is possible that this gene represents a regulatory subunit of COX and mediates the higher level of energy production in target cells by estrogen.

References

Further reading

External links